Adigrat University is a residential national university in Adigrat, Tigray Region, Ethiopia. The Ministry of Education admits qualified students to Adigrat University based on their score on the Ethiopian Higher Education Entrance Examination (EHEEE). Facilities at the university's campuses were "completely destroyed" during the Tigray War.

History
The main reason for the establishment of Adigrat University is said to have been initiated by Prime Minister Meles Zenawi during a visit to the town and a discussion with the town elders. The cornerstone for Adigrat University was laid in December 2008. The university was officially established via a government proclamation (Council of Ministers decree 223/2003) on May 26, 2011. In July 2011, the university opened with 4 colleges and 13 departments with 960 students.

During the Tigray War in late 2020 and early 2021, the facilities and properties of Adigrat University were "completely destroyed", according to Alula Habteab, head of the Bureau of Construction, Road and Transport in the Transitional Government of Tigray.

Academics 
Adigrat University has two campuses Bati Genahti Campus and Agame Campus.

Colleges 

 College of Engineering and Technology
 College of Medicine and Health Science
 College of Social Sciences and Humanities
 College of Business and Economics
 College of Natural and Computational Sciences
 College of Agriculture and Environmental Sciences

Library system 
Adigrat University's library system has archives, reading rooms, and research centers. The university administration has embarked of capacity building by investing in a media and communications department, cloud computing and telecom equipment, and digital library services.

Athletics 
The Adigrat University's team is called Welwalo, with colors gold and black. The Welwalo participates in Group A of the higher league in the Ethiopian Premier League as part of a football conference. The Welwalo men's football team plays home games at the Adigrat stadium.

References

References
Adigrat University

Universities and colleges in Ethiopia
Educational institutions established in 2011
Adigrat
2011 establishments in Ethiopia